KH Zagłębie Sosnowiec is an ice hockey team from Sosnowiec, Poland. They play in the Polska Hokej Liga, the top-level ice hockey league in Poland.

Sosnowiec was founded in 1937. They won five PLH titles in six years from 1980–1985, and one Polish 1. Liga title in 2005.

Achievements
Polish champion : 1980, 1981, 1982, 1983, 1985.
Polish 1.Liga champion : 2005

Ice hockey teams in Poland
Sosnowiec
Sport in Silesian Voivodeship